An officer in The Salvation Army is a Salvationist who is an ordained minister of the Christian faith, but who fulfills many other roles not usually filled by clergy of other denominations. They do so having been trained, ordained and commissioned to serve and lead and given a title which uses the terms of typical military rank.

Candidacy and training
When applying to become a Salvation Army officer, strict acceptance guidelines must be adhered to before training can commence. Each Salvation Army territory will have similar conditions that applicants must fulfill prior to entry and include the following, they must:

Believe they are called by God to full-time ministry, specifically officership.
Be active soldiers in their local Salvation Army corps.
Receive a recommendation from the commanding officer of that corps.
Be endorsed by the Salvation Army Divisional Candidates' Board.
Receive satisfactory references from their families, friends, and peers.
Attend an assessment conference weekend which includes a number of in-depth interviews with various assessors.
Be accepted for training by the Territorial Candidates' Board, and territorial commander. 

While attending a college for officer training, the training participants are referred to as "cadets". The length of training is normally twenty-two months, but a special dispensation may allow cadets to be commissioned after a shorter period, based on prior experience or training. Once this training is complete, the cadets are commissioned.

Officer training centres are located around the world.

Australia/New Zealand
 Eva Burrows College (Sydney, NSW)/(Melbourne, VIC)
Booth College of Mission (Wellington, NZ)

Canada
 College for Officer Training (Winnipeg, MB)
   
United States of America
 College for Officer Training (Chicago, IL)
 College for Officer Training (Suffern, NY)
 Evangeline Booth College (Atlanta, GA)
 College For Officer Training At Crestmont (Rancho Palos Verdes, CA)
United Kingdom
 William Booth College (London, UK)

Philippines
Officers Training College

Commissioning and posting

Commissioning sees the cadets promoted to the rank of lieutenant and formalizes the cadets' first posting (commonly referred to as "marching orders"). These orders can send the new lieutenants anywhere in the territory, and sometimes even see them posted to other territories that could involve overseas service.

Officers have the opportunity to serve within the Salvation Army in many different capacities, and may be posted at a corps, divisional or territorial headquarters, the training college, supplies & purchasing, a recovery and rehabilitation centre, as a chaplain in courts (cancelled in Australia 2020), hospital chaplaincy (cancelled in Australia 2020), prison chaplaincy, Salvation Army 24hr help line (Cancelled in Australia), Missing Person Bureau (Cancelled in Australia), a street level outreach centre, a new corps (a church known as an "outpost" or "plant"), or any number of other need specific ministries or administrative functions.

Officers are regularly posted, officers are given "farewell orders" every two to five years and they are reassigned to different posts.

The rank structure and uniform
Officers hold ranks throughout their service and into retirement, and their rank is reflected in their uniform. The uniform of an officer is much like that of a soldier and, like a soldier's, is defined by the region in which the person is serving. The consistent difference between the two uniforms is that the officer's uniform has red epaulettes, while a soldier's epaulettes are black or blue. Officers' epaulettes feature the Salvation "S" in silver, as well as another insignia to designate rank. These insignias may be sewn into the epaulette, or be separate metal pins attached to the epaulettes. Officers in all countries hold no legal or lawful commission as an Officer of any Government organisations; except that of being a public Minister of Religion.

Sources:

Other notable non-officers ranks (in no particular order):

Amendments to envoy and lieutenant rank
After a lengthy discussion with other Salvation Army leaders, General Shaw Clifton announced in November 2007 that the rank of lieutenant would be reinstated on March 1, 2008. All cadets are now commissioned as lieutenants for a period of five years. The rank of cadet-lieutenant was discontinued on the same date, but was reinstated in the USA Southern territory in June 2014.

All officers serving as lieutenants in the UK Territory now receive the rank of territorial envoy (as opposed to divisional envoy). Territorial envoys are soldiers who wish to work as non-commissioned officers for a limited time, usually three years. This replaced the rank of envoy and auxiliary-captain. Other territories have made other ranks to reflect this status such as feldsergeant in Germany; sergeant-major''' in the Ukraine; envoy in Russia and corpsenvoy'' in the Netherlands. In US Central they are simply envoys and in the US Southern territory they are sergeants.

Corporate officers
In some jurisdictions officials may also have legal status as the officers of corporations associated with Salvation Army organizations. For example in the United States,

Notes

See also
Generals of The Salvation Army
Chief of the Staff of The Salvation Army
High Council of The Salvation Army
Soldier of The Salvation Army

References

The Salvation Army
Methodist ecclesiastical offices
 Officers

ja:救世軍